Fideres Partners LLP (Fideres) is an international economic consulting firm that specializes in investigating corporate and financial wrongdoing. It provides economic analysis to competition regulators, law firms and their clients, from preliminary investigation to expert testimony.  Fideres was founded following the 2008 financial crisis.

History 
Fideres is a privately owned partnership established in 2009 by Alberto Thomas and Steffen Hennig.

Fideres has assisted litigation cases and provided research on financial market manipulation with work, among others, on LIBOR, FX, cryptocurrency market manipulation, and ISDAFIX.  

As of 2020, the firm employs 22 people across the UK, the United States, Germany and South Africa, with offices in London, Frankfurt, New York and Johannesburg.

Services

Expert Services 

Fideres works alongside law firms during the trial and pre-trial phase providing:
Economic investigations, 
Valuation and damages analysis, 
Expert reports,
Evidence in court and cross examination.

Research 

Research provided by Fideres focuses on the technical aspects of failed financial products and inefficient markets and has received press coverage by various media outlets. Their research into the debt market, and government economic policies, such as CBILS, was also covered by the media.    Their work analyzing trading patterns in foreign exchange markets was also featured on BBC Radio 4 in reference to the FOREX scandal. In 2016, Fideres's cofounder Alberto Thomas appeared on Sky News to discuss the ethics of Hedge Funds conducting and trading upon private exit polls for the UK.

Gold Price Manipulation 
Fideres's research showed that between January 2010 and December 2013 the price of gold may have been manipulated on "50 per cent of occasions," observing "instances of sharp movements in the price of the metal" during the two daily conference calls between Barclays, Deutsche Bank, HSBC, Scotiabank and Societe Generale, a process called "London gold fixing". Thomas called it an "anachronistic way" of setting the price for gold. The findings were also reported on the Financial Times, but according to Gold Anti-Trust Action Committee the article, titled "Fears Over Gold Price Rigging Put Investors on Alert", was deleted from the FT website for being "too sensitive".

Closet Indexers 
In 2014, fund groups faced investigation for misleading investors into buying so-called "closet indexers", funds sold as actively managed but behave like index trackers. Based on an analysis of 1,147 US equity funds with more than $1bn in assets, Fideres had found that 15 per cent of funds in the sample were closet indexers, concluding that investors could have been entitled to "billions of dollars" in damages.

Collateralized Loan Obligations 
With the global economy under pressure in 2020, debt markets came under scrutiny. Fideres was referenced in the media stating that significant losses will be felt by bondholders who own bonds rated BBB or below.

Coronavirus Business Interruption Loan Scheme 
Following the economic shutdown triggered by COVID-19, the UK government announced a business loan scheme to support affected businesses. At the time of the announcement, Fideres was quoted in a number of articles addressing the CBILS central proposals.

Notable Cases

Corporate Bond Under-Pricing 

Research conducted by Fideres found evidence of systemic overpricing in the bond market. Bloomberg and Reuters reported on the study, which analyzed the pricing of corporate bonds for the period 2010-2015. It estimated that, due to the mis-pricing carried out by the banks, US corporations may have lost up “to $18 billion” when they issued debt. Business Insider UK considered the research particularly “noteworthy” in relation to the size of the bond market while Tracy Alloway, executive editor of Bloomberg, wrote on her Twitter account that the story may represent a "Libor moment in the bond market,” in reference to the LIBOR scandal.

LIBOR Manipulation 

After the LIBOR scandal broke in 2012,  Thomas appeared as a witness at a Treasury Select Committee hearing on benchmark manipulation on 2 July 2014. The role of committee was to review the banking sector after banks were found to manipulate various financial benchmarks to their gain. Thomas talked about why and how the manipulation had occurred, the facts related to the manipulation, and suggested a three-point plan which could help prevent it going forward.

FOREX Market Rigging 

In 2014, Fideres supplied a research highlighting "unusual" price spikes in euro, sterling and other major currencies for the City of Philadelphia Board of Pensions and Retirement's class action lawsuit against major Forex dealer banks. The suit claimed that seven different banks (Barclays, Citigroup, Deutsche Bank, HSBC, JPMorgan, Royal Bank of Scotland and UBS) had "deliberately" been manipulating the price of FX trading around the 4pm daily fixing.

ISDAfix Rigging 

In 2014, more than a dozen financial institutions, including Bank of America, Barclays, BNP Paribas, Citigroup, and Wells Fargo, faced allegations of attempting to manipulate the ISDAfix rate used for derivative contracts. The allegations were based on a research conducted and compiled by Fideres, which alleged that the defendant banks had submitted the same or virtually the same dollar ISDAfix rate quotes almost every day from 2009 to 2012, “down to five decimal points," resulting in the official ISDAfix rate and the banks’ contributions being identical to the ICAP reference rate "well over 90% of the time for at least four years.”

Cryptocurrency Market Manipulation 

Tether, a cryptocurrency stablecoin, which states that its coins are pegged 1:1 with the US dollar, had a class action filed against it in November 2019 alleging that Tether issuances had been timed to trigger movements in the price of Bitcoin. Research conducted by Fideres found that there were significant price moves following Tether issuances. The case alleges that the Tether manipulation caused a loss of "$265 billion in cryptocurrency wealth".

See also 
 LIBOR scandal
 Treasury Select Committee
 Tether (cryptocurrency)
Economic consulting
Litigation funding
Compass Lexecon
Analysis Group
Bates White
Berkeley Research Group
Brattle Group
Charles River Associates
Cornerstone Research
NERA Economic Consulting

References

External links

Fideres Offices 
UK: 10 Marshalsea Road, London, SE1 1HL

US: 380 Lexington Ave, New York, NY 10168

Germany:  An der Welle 4, Frankfurt, 60322

South Africa: Regus, West Tower, Sandton,  Johannesburg, 2146
International consulting firms
Macroeconomics consulting firms